Galloping Hoofs is a 1924 American silent Western film serial directed by George B. Seitz and starring Allene Ray and Johnnie Walker. The film is now considered to be lost.

Cast
 Allene Ray as Carole Page
 Johnnie Walker as David Kirby
 J. Barney Sherry as Richard Shaw
 Ernest Hilliard as Stephen Carrington
 Armand Cortes as Perry Gerard (credited as Armand Cortez)
 William Nally as Bob Monson
 George Nardelli as Emirof Smyrniston
 Albert Roccardi as Aby y'Souf

Chapters

The Sealed Box
The Mountain Raid
Neck and Neck
The Duplicate Box
The Fateful Jump
Raging Waters
Out of the Depths
Ambushed
Tricked
Flying Colors

See also
 List of film serials
 List of film serials by studio
 List of lost films

References

External links

 

1924 films
1924 lost films
1924 Western (genre) films
American silent serial films
American black-and-white films
Films directed by George B. Seitz
Lost Western (genre) films
Lost American films
Pathé Exchange film serials
Silent American Western (genre) films
1920s American films